Michael Hoey (born 5 February 1939) is an Irish long-distance runner. He competed in the men's 5000 metres at the 1960 Summer Olympics.

References

1939 births
Living people
Athletes (track and field) at the 1960 Summer Olympics
Irish male long-distance runners
Olympic athletes of Ireland
Place of birth missing (living people)